Reindl is a surname. Notable people with the surname include:

Franz Reindl (born 1954), German ice hockey player
Lujza Reindl (1850-1926), Hungarian actress and singer better known as Lujza Blaha
Milos Reindl (1923–2002), Czech-Canadian artist and graphic designer
Stefania Reindl (1922–1993), Polish artistic gymnast

Surnames from given names